Saints and Sinners is the fourth studio album from Matt Maher. Essential Records released the project on March 17, 2015.

Critical reception

Designating the album a four star release at CCM Magazine, Andy Argyrakis depicts, "Maher gives listeners yet another collection split between personal and worshipful morsels." Mark D. Geil, mentioning in a four star review from Jesus Freak Hideout, responds, "Saints and Sinners finds him in his stride, and adding a unique concept that is, for the most part, quite well executed." Specifying in a four and a half star review by Worship Leader, Jeremy Armstrong responds, "the result is a litany of gutsy, profound, and beautiful worship songs" that "cements Maher’s already-stalwart position as one of today’s most important worship songwriters." Tony Cummings, giving the album a nine out of ten rating for Cross Rhythms, writes, "this album is a work of inspiring craftsmanship." Former CCM Magazine editor, Lindsay Williams, rating the album five out of five stars for The Sound Opinion, recognizes, "Saints & Sinners positions Maher as more than a songwriter content to sit in someone else’s shadow... He's found his unique artistic voice, and this album proves he's not afraid to use it." Indicating in a review by BREATHEcast, Jeannie Law realizes, "Overall it's evident that Maher really put his heart and soul into the making of the entire record." Kevin Davis, signaling in a five star review by New Release Tuesday, describes, "This album provides listeners with eleven tracks of vertical offerings to God that you can sing in any circumstance, and this is my album of the year." Awarding the album three and a half stars for Louder Than the Music, Philip Aldis writes, "there are more gourmet moments than sprouts left on the side, and the centre-pieces are enhanced by intimate production at just the right moments." Rating the album a 4.3 out of five from Christian Music Review, Laura Chambers says, "Saints and Sinners pulls us off the beaten path for a humility lesson, before turning us loose again to use our newly opened eyes to change hearts and the world." Rebekah Joy, awarding the album nine out of ten stars for Jesus Wired, writes, "Saints and Sinners is a great album."

Accolades
This album was No. 6, on the Worship Leader'''s Top 20 Albums of 2015 list.

The song, "Because He Lives (Amen)", was No. 1, on the Worship Leaders Top 20 Songs of 2015 list.

Track listing

 Personnel 
 Matt Maher – vocals, acoustic piano, synthesizers, programming, acoustic guitar 
 Jason Ingram – programming
 Jonathan Smith – programming
 Tim Lauer – acoustic piano, synthesizers, Hammond B3 organ, programming 
 Paul Moak – acoustic piano, synthesizers, acoustic guitar, electric guitar, pedal steel guitar, percussion, backing vocals 
 Jacob Sooter – keyboards 
 Ed Cash – programming, acoustic guitar, backing vocals 
 Hank Bentley – electric guitar 
 Kris Donegan – acoustic guitar, electric guitar, slide guitar
 Gabe Scott – acoustic guitar 
 Matt Pierson – bass 
 Matthew Melton – bass 
 Paul Mabury – drums 
 Richard Scott – drums, percussion
 Callie Cryer – backing vocals 
 Phoebe Cryer – backing vocals 
 Morgan Harper-Nichols – backing vocals 
 Leslie Jordan – vocals (4)
 David Leonard – vocals (4)
 Jon Foreman – vocals (8)Choir'''
 Blaine Barcus, Brenton Brown, Kat Davis, Janice Gaines, Katie Haskell, Nicole Koester, Matt Maher, Paul Moak, Jake Neumar, Calvin Nowell, Diane Sheets, Keithon Stribling, Jill Tomalty, Nina Williams and Luke Woodard

Charts
In its first week of release, the album sold 8,000 copies in the U.S.

References

2015 albums
Matt Maher albums
Essential Records (Christian) albums